Douglas Yeats (born 1 November 1957) is a Canadian former wrestler who competed in the 1976 Summer Olympics, in the 1984 Summer Olympics, in the 1988 Summer Olympics, and in the 1992 Summer Olympics. He qualified for the Olympics in 1980; however, Canada boycotted. Yeats was born in Montreal, Quebec, Canada.

References

External links
 

1957 births
Living people
Sportspeople from Montreal
Anglophone Quebec people
Olympic wrestlers of Canada
Wrestlers at the 1976 Summer Olympics
Wrestlers at the 1984 Summer Olympics
Wrestlers at the 1988 Summer Olympics
Wrestlers at the 1992 Summer Olympics
Canadian male sport wrestlers
Pan American Games medalists in wrestling
Pan American Games gold medalists for Canada
Wrestlers at the 1979 Pan American Games
20th-century Canadian people